Adamsiella is a genus of red alga closely related to the genus Lenormandia. The holotype species for the genus is Adamsiella melchiori L.E. Phillips & W.A. Nelson.

References

Rhodomelaceae
Red algae genera